The cupon was the temporary currency of Moldova between 1992 and 1993. It replaced the Soviet rouble at par and was replaced by the leu at a rate of 1 leu = 1,000 cupoane. Notes issued included 50, 200, 1,000, and 5,000 cupoane. It was issued only in paper form.

Gallery

See also

Modern obsolete currencies
History of Moldova since 1991
Economic history of Moldova
1992 establishments in Moldova
1993 disestablishments
1992 in economics
1993 in economics